The Arima Kinen (有馬記念) is a Grade I flat horse race in Japan open to Thoroughbreds which are three-years-old or above and the world's largest betting horserace.  It is run over a distance of 2,500 metres (approximately 1 mile and  furlongs) at Nakayama Racecourse, and it takes place annually in late December. It is one of the two "All-Star" races in Japanese horse racing; the other is the Takarazuka Kinen in late June.

The event was first run in 1956, and it was initially titled the Nakayama Grand Prix (中山グランプリ). The following year it was renamed in memory of Yoriyasu Arima (1884–1957), the founder of the race. The distance was originally set at 2,600 metres, and it was shortened to the present length, 2,500 metres, in 1966.

The majority of the runners (10 out of 16) in the field are selected by a vote from racing fans, which must be a Japan Racing Association horse. If at least one horse in top 10 decided not to participate in the race, the void will be filled with next available horse until 10 available runners are filled. The remainder of 6 (including National Association of Racing (NAR) and foreign-based horses) are determined by the amount of prize money won.

Until 1999 the Arima Kinen was open to Japanese trained horses only. However, the Japan Racing Association introduced a new condition in 2000 which allowed for the participation of a foreign trained horse, if it had won that year's Japan Cup (though, no horse eligible has ended up participating this race). The Arima Kinen was classed as a Domestic Grade I until 2006, and it was then promoted to an International Grade I in 2007. Consequently, it is now possible for more foreign trained horses to compete in the race. The maximum number of these was set at four in 2007, and this increased to six for the 2008 running.

Records
Speed record:
 2:29.5 – Zenno Rob Roy (2004)

Most wins:
 2 – Speed Symboli (1969, 1970)
 2 – Symboli Rudolf (1984, 1985)
 2 – Oguri Cap (1988, 1990)
 2 – Grass Wonder (1998, 1999)
 2 – Symboli Kris S (2002, 2003)
 2 - Orfevre (2011, 2013)

Most wins by a jockey:
 4 - Kenichi Ikezoe (2009,2011,2013,2018)

Winners since 1988

Vote Leaders since 1998

In 2004 vote, Zenno Rob Roy was estimated to have received fewer votes than Cosmo Bulk (Deduced from the official result of Internet vote). However, as Cosmo Bulk was not a Japan Racing Association horse (but belonged to Hokkaido Keiba from NAR) all votes cast for him were invalid.
Vodka was not allowed to participate in the 2009 race, as she was on a 1-month suspension due to nose bleeding in the Japan Cup.

Earlier winners

 1956 - Meiji Hikari
 1957 - Hakuchikara
 1958 - Onward There
 1959 - Garnet
 1960 - Star Roch
 1961 - Homareboshi
 1962 - Onslaught
 1963 - Ryu Forel
 1964 - Yamato Kyodai
 1965 - Shinzan
 1966 - Korehide
 1967 - Kabuto Ciro
 1968 - Ryuzuki
 1969 - Speed Symboli
 1970 - Speed Symboli
 1971 - Tomei
 1972 - Ishino Hikaru
 1973 - Strong Eight
 1974 - Tanino Chikara
 1975 - Ishino Arashi
 1976 - Tosho Boy
 1977 - Ten Point
 1978 - Kane Minobu
 1979 - Green Grass
 1980 - Hoyo Boy
 1981 - Amber Shadai
 1982 - Hikari Duel
 1983 - Lead Hoyu
 1984 - Symboli Rudolf
 1985 - Symboli Rudolf
 1986 - Dyna Gulliver
 1987 - Mejiro Durren

See also
 Horse racing in Japan
 List of Japanese flat horse races

References
Racing Post: 

 japanracing.jp – "The 53rd Arima Kinen" (2008)
 pedigreequery.com

Open middle distance horse races
Horse races in Japan
Turf races in Japan